James William Dunn (February 25, 1931 – January 6, 1999) — also known as Bill Dunn — was an American professional baseball player, a right-handed pitcher who worked in three Major League games, all in relief, for the  Pittsburgh Pirates. He graduated from Gadsden, Alabama, High School in 1949 and attended the University of Alabama.

Dunn's professional career extended for nine seasons (1951–1959), spent in the Pirates' and Chicago Cubs' organizations. In his first two MLB appearances, August 26 and 28, 1952, he faced the defending National League champion New York Giants and pitched 3⅓ hitless, scoreless innings, with two strikeouts. In his final big league game, on September 12, he worked two innings and allowed two earned runs on four hits to the Boston Braves at Braves Field.

He spent the rest of his career in minor league baseball, winning 15 games for the Class C Billings Mustangs in 1955 in his finest season.

References

External links

1931 births
1999 deaths
Alabama Crimson Tide baseball players
Baseball players from Alabama
Baseball players from Georgia (U.S. state)
Billings Mustangs players
Burlington Bees players
Burlington-Graham Pirates players
Butler Tigers players
Des Moines Bruins players
Fort Worth Cats players
Lancaster Red Roses players
Major League Baseball pitchers
Sportspeople from Gadsden, Alabama
Pittsburgh Pirates players
Pueblo Bruins players
Waco Pirates players